
Year 389 BC was a year of the pre-Julian Roman calendar. At the time, it was known as the Year of the Tribunate of Poplicola, Capitolinus, Esquilinus, Mamercinus, Cornelius and Albinus (or, less frequently, year 365 Ab urbe condita). The denomination 389 BC for this year has been used since the early medieval period, when the Anno Domini calendar era became the prevalent method in Europe for naming years.

Events 
 By place 
 Greece 
 A Spartan expeditionary force under King Agesilaus II crosses the Gulf of Corinth to attack Acarnania, an ally of the anti-Spartan coalition. Agesilaus is eventually able to draw them into a pitched battle, in which the Acarnanians are routed.
 The Athenian general, Thrasybulus, leads a force of triremes to levy tribute from cities around the Aegean and support Rhodes, where a democratic government is struggling against Sparta. On this campaign, Thrasybulus captures Byzantium, imposes a duty on ships passing through the Hellespont, and collects tribute from many of the Aegean Islands.
 Due to threats of attack from Akarnania, Kalydon garrisons the Achaeans.
 The orator Isaeus gives his earliest known speech, the Dicaeogenes.
Magna Grecia
Battle of the Elleporus and the capture of Kroton by Dionysius I of Syracuse

 China 

 Wu Qi, the prime minister of the State of Chu, enacts his first series of political, municipal, and martial reforms. Wu Qi gains the ire and distrust of Chu officials and aristocratic elite who are against his crusades to sweep up corruption in the state and limit their power. He is eventually assassinated in 381 BC at the funeral of King Diao of Chu, although his assassins are executed shortly after by the newly enthroned King Su of Chu.
 This is the latest possible date for the compilation of the historical text Zuo Zhuan, attributed to a blind historian known as Zuo Qiuming.

Births 
 Aeschines, Greek statesman and orator (d. 314 BC)

Deaths

References